The Indonesian Television Journalists Association (Indonesian: Ikatan Jurnalis Televisi Indonesia; IJTI) is an organization of journalists in Indonesia's privately owned channels RCTI, TPI, SCTV, Indosiar, and ANTV. It was established in August 1998, near the beginning of Indonesia's Reformation (Reformasi) period.

Indonesian journalism organizations
Professional associations based in Indonesia
Television organizations in Indonesia